Gunnar Bull Gundersen (5 April 1929 – 7 November 1993) was a Norwegian sailor, novelist, playwright and lyricist.

Biography
Gunnar Bull Gundersen was born at Stavanger  in Rogaland, Norway. Gundersen grew up with changing foster parents and at different boarding schools. He referred to his young years as a very itinerant childhood  and said he had visited 10 schools and been expelled from three of them. Shortly after World War II, he went to sea. He was welfare secretary in the State Welfare Office for the merchant navy (Statens Velferdskontor for Handelsflåten), where he was stationed in Antwerp, Rotterdam and Liverpool.  He took the officer and later captain examinations at Oslo Public Seamen's School (Oslo Offentlige Sjømannsskole) in 1953 and sailed for some years as an officer in foreign trade.  At one time he was also captain of the ferry between Nesodden and Oslo. While a newly qualified officer, he was hired as stage manager at the Radio Theatre for the Norwegian Broadcasting Corporation.

Gundersen was active in many fields. He was a theater director, novelist, playwright, emcee of radio and television, and wrote  lyrics with jazz musicians or in concert with his friend and colleague, lyricist   Harald Sverdrup  (1923–1992). He also made an important contribution as an enthusiastic jazz communicates through a long series of radio programs in 1960 - 1970.  In addition, he was a frequent contributor to the press.

In 1956, he made his literary debut with the novel Om natten – en bakgårdsfantasi. He was soon noticed  for his sure sense of language and fanciful imagination, which would become his trademarks. Gundersen published twelve novels receiving positive reviews and earning  several awards. Gundersen was awarded the Norwegian Critics Prize for Literature in 1959 for the novel Martin. For the stage, he wrote several plays and in collaboration with Jon Michelet  (1944–2018) wrote  Matros Tore Solem og hans skip (1979).

Selected works
Om natten – en bakgårdsfantasi (novel) 1956
Martin (novel) 1959
Judith; blader fra en kystskippers dagbok (novel) 1963
En dagdrivers opptegnelser (short stories) 1966
Han som ville male havet (novel) 1968
De hjemløse (novel) 1977
Matros Tore Solem og hans skip (play, with Jon Michelet)  1979

Awards 
Norwegian Critics Prize for Literature (Kritikerprisen) - 1959
Mads Wiel Nygaard's Endowment  (Mads Wiel Nygaards legat) - 1960
Riksmål Society Literature Prize (Riksmålsforbundets litteraturpris) - 1961

References 

1929 births
1993 deaths
People from Stavanger
20th-century Norwegian novelists
Norwegian radio personalities
Norwegian music journalists
Norwegian dramatists and playwrights
Norwegian theatre people
Norwegian Critics Prize for Literature winners
20th-century Norwegian journalists